Datuk Julita Majungki is a Malaysian politician who has served as the State Assistant Minister of Finance in the Gabungan Rakyat Sabah (GRS) state administration under Chief Minister and Minister Hajiji Noor as well as Masidi Manjun since October 2022 and Member of Sabah State Legislative Assembly (MLA) for Matunggong since May 2018. She served as the State Assistant Minister of Community Development and People's Wellbeing of Sabah in the GRS state administration under Chief Minister Hajiji and Minister Shahelmey Yahya from October 2020 to October 2022. She is also a member of the United Sabah Party (PBS) which is aligned with the ruling GRS coalition. She has also served as the Secretary-General of PBS since July 2022 and Information Chief of PBS from January 2021 to July 2022.

Election results

Honours
  :
  Commander of the Order of Kinabalu (PGDK) – Datuk (2020)

References

Members of the Sabah State Legislative Assembly
Kadazan-Dusun people
United Sabah Party politicians
Living people
1971 births